Eupithecia tshimganica is a moth in the family Geometridae. It is found in Afghanistan, Uzbekistan and Tajikistan.

Adults are pale yellowish or yellow-grey.

References

Moths described in 1988
tshimganica
Moths of Asia